PVN Tower is a proposed skyscraper project that will be built in Hanoi, Vietnam. The Ocean Bank and Petrovietnam Construction Corporation publicly declared this project on May 7, 2010 in Hanoi. It will be a 102-story tower and is expected to be the tallest building in Vietnam. The estimated investment cost will be more than $ 1 billion. The tower will be used for commercial and financial activities. On March 31, 2011, Petrovietnam reclaimed they would cut the height of the tower due to economic reasons.

See also
List of tallest buildings in Vietnam

References

External links
Vietnam’s tallest building to take shape on VOV

Skyscrapers in Hanoi
Proposed skyscrapers
Proposed buildings and structures in Vietnam